The Great Northwest Athletic Conference (GNAC) is a college athletic conference affiliated with the National Collegiate Athletic Association (NCAA) at the Division II level. It has historically operated in the northwestern United States, but also includes schools in Alaska, Montana, and British Columbia.

The GNAC is the only NCAA conference in any division with a Canadian university as a member.

History
The conference formed in 2001 when its original ten members split from the Pacific West Conference.

Chronological timeline
 2001 - The Great Northwest Athletic Conference (GNAC) was founded. Charter members included the University of Alaska at Fairbanks, the University of Alaska at Anchorage, Central Washington University, Humboldt State University (now California State Polytechnic University, Humboldt), Northwest Nazarene University, Saint Martin's, Seattle University, Seattle Pacific University, Western Oregon University and Western Washington, effective beginning the 2001-02 academic year.
 2006 - Humboldt State left the GNAC to join the California Collegiate Athletic Association (CCAA), effective after the 2005-06 academic year.
 2007 - Montana State University at Billings joined the GNAC, effective in the 2007-08 academic year.
 2008 - Seattle left the GNAC to join the Division I ranks of the National Collegiate Athletic Association (NCAA) as an NCAA D-I Independent (who would later join the Western Athletic Conference (WAC), effective beginning the 2012-13 academic year), effective after the 2007-08 academic year.
 2008 - Dixie State University joined the GNAC as an affiliate member for football (with Humboldt State returning for that sport), effective with the 2008 fall season (2008-09 academic year).
 2010 - Simon Fraser University joined the GNAC, effective in the 2010-11 academic year.
 2012 - Three institutions joined the GNAC as affiliate members: Azusa Pacific University for football, and the University of Mary and the University of Sioux Falls for men's soccer, all effective with the 2012-13 academic year.
 2013 - South Dakota School of Mines and Technology (South Dakota Mines) joined the GNAC as an affiliate member for men's soccer, effective in the 2013 fall season (2013-14 academic year).
 2014 - South Dakota Mines added football to its GNAC affiliate membership, effective in the 2014 fall season (2014-15 academic year).
 2015 - South Dakota Mines left the GNAC as an affiliate member for men's soccer, effective after the 2014 fall season (2014-15 academic year).
 2015 - Concordia University–Portland joined the GNAC, effective in the 2015-16 academic year.
 2016 - Dixie State and South Dakota Mines left the GNAC as affiliate members for football, effective after the 2015 fall season (2015-16 academic year).
 2019 - Humboldt State left the GNAC as an affiliate member for football as the school announced it was dropping the sport after the 2018 fall season (2018-19 academic year).
 2019 - The University of California San Diego (UC San Diego) and the University of Central Oklahoma (along with Humboldt State returning for that sport), joined the GNAC as affiliate members for women's rowing, effective in the 2020 spring season (2019-20 academic year).
 2020 - Concordia–Portland left the GNAC as the school announced that it would close, effective after the 2019-20 academic year.
 2020 - UC San Diego left the GNAC as an affiliate member for women's rowing, effective after the 2020 spring season (2019-20 academic year), coinciding with the start of its transition to NCAA Division I.
 2022 - Central Washington, Western Oregon and Simon Fraser, the only 3 football-sponsoring schools remaining in the GNAC, announce that they will be joining the Lone Star Conference as football affiliates, bringing an end to the GNAC as a football conference, effective after the 2021-22 academic year.

Member schools

Current members
The GNAC currently has ten full members, all but three are public schools:

Notes

Affiliate members
The GNAC currently has two affiliate members, both are public schools:

Notes

Former members
The GNAC had three former full members, all but one were private schools:

Notes

Former affiliate members
The GNAC had seven former affiliate members, all but three were public schools:

Notes

Membership timeline

Sports sponsored

Men's sponsored sports by school

Women's sponsored sports by school

 Seattle Pacific is set to launch women's golf starting in 2024

Other sponsored sports by school

Football champions

Basketball champions

Conference Facilities

References

External links

 
Sports in the Western United States